= Kyaw Min Than =

Burmese bodybuilder

- ကျော်မင်းသန်း
- Professional bodybuilder

Personal info
- Born: Myanmar

Best statistics

Kyaw Min Than is a Burmese professional bodybuilder. He is a two-time gold medalist at the Southeast Asian Bodybuilding Championship.

== Career ==
In 2018, he won the gold medal at the 15th Bodybuilding and Physique Championship held in Cambodia. In the same year, he won the 16th Southeast Asian Bodybuilding and Physique Championship in the 55 kg category which took place in Yangon, Myanmar.

And, he also contested at the 10th`World Bodybuilding And Physique Sports Championship 2018 held in Chiang Mai, Thailand at December 14. He finished fourth.

On 20 May 2019, he won gold medal at the Southeast Asia Bodybuilding and Physique Championship 2019 on 55 kg category in Yangon, Myanmar .

== Competitive placings ==
- 2018 15th Bodybuilding and Physique Championships- First Prize
- 2018 16th Bodybuilding and Physique Championships- First Prize
- 2018 10th`World Bodybuilding And Physique Sports Championship 2018- 4th runner up
- 2019 Southeast Asia Bodybuilding and Physique Championship - First Prize
